In mathematics, E-functions are a type of power series that satisfy particular arithmetic conditions on the coefficients. They are of interest in transcendental number theory, and are more special than G-functions.

Definition

A function  is called of type , or an -function, if the power series

satisfies the following three conditions:

 All the coefficients  belong to the same algebraic number field, which has finite degree over the rational numbers;
 For all ,
,
.

Uses

-functions were first studied by Siegel in 1929.  He found a method to show that the values taken by certain -functions were algebraically independent. This was a result which established the algebraic independence of classes of numbers rather than just linear independence. Since then these functions have proved somewhat useful in number theory and in particular they have application in transcendence proofs and differential equations.

The Siegel–Shidlovsky theorem

Perhaps the main result connected to -functions is the Siegel–Shidlovsky theorem (also known as the Siegel and Shidlovsky theorem), named after Carl Ludwig Siegel and Andrei Borisovich Shidlovsky.

Suppose that we are given  -functions, that satisfy a system of homogeneous linear differential equations

Examples

 Any polynomial with algebraic coefficients is a simple example of an -function.
 If  is an algebraic number then the Bessel function  is an -function.
 The sum or product of two -functions is an -function.  In particular -functions form a ring.

References

 

Number theory